St Mary's Chapel is a former Anglican parish church in the village of High Legh, Cheshire, England.  It is recorded in the National Heritage List for England as a designated Grade II* listed building.

History

The chapel was built around 1581 as a chapel of ease to High Legh East Hall.  High Legh became a separate parish in 1817.  The parish was refounded in 1973 with the nearby St John's Church as the parish church.  The hall has been demolished.  The church was restored in 1836, another restoration was carried out by William Butterfield in 1858, and the chancel, designed by John Oldrid Scott, was added in 1884.

Architecture

Exterior
The chapel is built in ashlar stone with a tiled roof.  Its plan consists of a nave with aisles and a chancel.  On the west front is a central porch with pilasters.  Above the porch is a three-light Perpendicular window and on each side are two light perpendicular windows.  On the gable is a square bell turret with a single bell.  On the east front is a four-light 19th-century Perpendicular-style window.

Interior
The ceiling has 19th-century pargeting with Tudor roses, fleurs de lys and stars.  The pews in the nave dated 1858 are by Butterfield and the wainscotting and screens of 1884 by are by J. Oldrid Scott.

External features

To mark the advent of the third millennium a carved stone was erected in the grounds of the chapel.

See also

Grade II* listed buildings in Cheshire East
Listed buildings in High Legh

References

External links

Information about the stained glass from the Corpus Vitrearum Medii Aevi (CVMA) of Great Britain

Churches completed in 1581
16th-century Church of England church buildings
Churches completed in 1836
Churches completed in 1884
Chapels in England
High Legh
Church of England church buildings in Cheshire
English Gothic architecture in Cheshire
Gothic Revival architecture in Cheshire
Diocese of Chester
1581 establishments in England